Viacom, an abbreviation of Video and Audio Communications, may refer to:

 Viacom (1952–2006), a former American media conglomerate
 Viacom (2005–2019), a former company spun off from the original Viacom
 Viacom18, a joint venture between Paramount Global and TV18 in India
 Viacom18 Studios, the film subsidiary of Viacom18

See also
 CBS (disambiguation)
 Paramount (disambiguation)
 Paramount Global, an American media conglomerate known as ViacomCBS until 2022

Paramount Global